Zarechnoye is a rural locality (a selo) in Otvazhensky Selsoviet of Arkharinsky District, Amur Oblast, Russia. The population was 50 in 2018. There are 3 streets.

Geography 
Zarechnoye is located 15 km southeast of Arkhara (the district's administrative centre) by road. Arkadyevka is the nearest rural locality.

References 

Rural localities in Arkharinsky District